Jon Ander Olasagasti Imizcoz (born 16 August 2000) is a Spanish professional footballer who plays as a midfielder for Real Sociedad B.

Club career
Born in San Sebastián, Gipuzkoa, Basque Country, Olasagasti joined Real Sociedad's youth setup in 2014. He made his senior debut with the C-team on 26 August 2017, playing the last 20 minutes of a 0–2 Tercera División away loss against SCD Durango.

Olasagasti scored his first senior goal on 2 September 2018, netting the C's third goal in a 6–0 home routing of SD Zamudio. He scored seven goals for the side during the season, and was subsequently promoted to the reserves in the Segunda División B in July 2019.

On 1 July 2020, Olasagasti renewed his contract with the Txuri-urdin until 2023, and was a regular starter during the campaign as his side returned to the Segunda División after 59 years.

Olasagasti made his professional debut on 24 September 2021, starting in a 0–2 home loss against SD Huesca. Eight days later he scored his first professional goal, netting the opener in a 4–1 away routing of AD Alcorcón.

On 1 December 2021, Olasagasti made his first-team debut by starting in a 4–0 away routing of CF Panadería Pulido in the season's Copa del Rey.

References

External links

2000 births
Living people
Footballers from San Sebastián
Spanish footballers
Association football midfielders
Segunda División players
Segunda División B players
Tercera División players
Antiguoko players
Real Sociedad C footballers
Real Sociedad B footballers
Real Sociedad footballers
Spain under-21 international footballers